Dr. Punjabrao Deshmukh Polytechnic College is a polytechnic college in Amravati, Maharashtra state, India. It is run by the Shri Shivaji Education Society. Branches available: CO, EX, IF, CR.

References

External links
 

Universities and colleges in Maharashtra
Education in Amravati